Beinn Bhàn, meaning White Mountain in Gaelic, is a common name, applied to several hills in different parts of Scotland:

Beinn Bhàn (Applecross), a 896 m Corbett and Marilyn on the Applecross peninsula
Beinn Bhàn (Arkaig), a 796 m Corbett and Marilyn south of Loch Arkaig
Beinn Bhàn (Kilmartin), a 319 m Marilyn near Kilmartin

See also
 Binn Bhán or Benbaun, a 729 m Marilyn in Connemara, Ireland